KF Tomori is an Albanian football club based in the city of Berat. The club's home ground is the Tomori Stadium and they currently participate in the Kategoria e Parë.

History
The sport of football was introduced to the city of Berat in the early 1910s by students who had completed their studies abroad. They brought back footballs and the rules of the game from their travels which they then passed onto the locals. As early as 1913, amateur neighbourhood teams were formed, such as Çunat e Lumit, Vakëfi, Kalaja and Opinga. In 1923, an artists and sports club was founded in Berat, under the name Tomori, named after the nearby Mount Tomorr. It was established in the neighbourhood facilities of a local school called Mangalem, and the first team was formed with 18 teenage players. With the Albanian Football Association's foundation in 1930, the club participated in its first official tournament in the same year, which was the second tier of the newly established Albanian football system. Tomori won the 1930 Albanian First Division and gained promotion to the Albanian Superliga. Prior to their debut season in the top flight the club changed its name from Tomori to Muzaka in 1931, and during the 1931 season, they finished in 7th and last place with a record of 1 draw and 5 losses, which led to their relegation. They returned to the Albanian First Division in 1932 where they would remain for 4 seasons. In 1935, the Albanian Football Association did not organise any competitions so the club was not active for the year. In 1936, football resumed in Albania and the club changed its name back to Tomori and finished second in the Albanian First Division, achieving promotion to the Albanian Superliga for the second time. In 1936 season, the club again finished last in the top flight, level on points with Ismail Qemali Vlorë, who they lost 2–1 to in a relegation play off held in Kavajë at the end of the season to determine Tomori's immediate relegation once again.

1936–1949: KS Tomori
1950: Berati
1951–1957: Puna
1957–deri tani: KS Tomori

Members of the Presidency: (1923–1926)
Chairman: Zyhdi Doko
Secretary: Shyqyri Lakra
Other members:
Lilo Xhimitiku
Andon Myzeqari
Vangjel Haxhistasa
Alqiviadhi Shyti

In 1964, Tomori was runner-up in the Albanian Cup, losing in the final to KS Partizani.

Tomori won the Albanian First Division championship four times: in 1930, 1950, 1970, and 1977.

In 1991–1992, F.K Tomori participated in the Balkans Cup but lost on aggregate to FC Oţelul Galaţi (2:4), who went on to be runners-up of the competition.

Their first participation in European football was in the UEFA Cup 2000-01, losing 2–5 on aggregate to Cypriot team APOEL F.C.

In 2000, F.K Tomori were runners-up in the championship, losing on penalty kicks against FK Tirana with the game having finished 1–1 after extra time had been played.

Stadium
Tomori Stadium was built in 1985 and holds 14,500 spectators. This is the third highest capacity stadium in Albania after Qemal Stafa Stadium and Loro Boriçi Stadium. The stadium finally completed its renovation in early 2012, where 13,000 tickets went on sale for the first game held there. Interest was high because the last Albanian Superliga game to be held there was in 2002.

Fans
Tomori has some of the most fervent fans in Albania.

Also, Tomori have tifo-groups like Mistrecat, Berat Hooligans and Ultras Tomori.

Rivalries
Tomori's biggest rivals are Naftëtari, with Kuçovë only 20 kilometres down the road and with fans of both clubs working together in the textile industry during the 1970s. Also Lushnja and Apolonia Fier are in a small distance from each other.

Honours

Kategoria e Parë:
 Winners (4): 1930, 1950–51, 1970–71, 1976–77
   Runners-up (7): 1957, 1958,1962, 1975–76, 1988–89, 2002–03, 2010–11,
Kategoria Superiore:
   Runners-up (1): 1999–00

Albanian Cup:
   Runners-up (1): 1963–64

Balkans Cup:
   Semi-final (1):  1991–92

Albanian Second Division:
 Winners (1): 2015-2016

European Cups history 

2000–01 UEFA Cup
After finishing second in the 1999-2000 season, Tomori would play for the first time against APOEL. Since that year the team has never been able to play in European competitions. Gentian Lako was the first player to score a goal for Tomori in a UEFA CUP qualifying round. 
 QR1'=1st Qualifying Round

Recent seasons

Players

Current squad

Notable players
  Theodhor Arbëri

  Arben Arbëri

  Përparim Kovaçi

  Klodian Arbëri

  Polizoi Arbëri

  Kliton Bozgo

 James Adeniyi

  Ilirjan Çaushaj

  Myrto Uzuni

Top scorers of Albanian Superliga

Coaching staff and officials

Historical list of coaches

 Mandi Xhamo (1973)
 Guxim Mukli (1990-1991)
 Fatos Karkanjozi (1992-1994)
 Kristaq Mile (1994)
 Fatos Karkanjozi (1995)
 Kristaq Mile (1995)
 Fatos Karkanjozi (1996)
 Kristaq Mile (1996-1997)
 Theodhor Arbëri (1998-2000)
 Kristaq Mile (2000-2001)
 Theodhor Arbëri (2001)
 Saimir Dauti (2001-2002)
 Kristaq Mile (2002)
 Eqerem Memushi (Jul 2010 – 22 Jan 2011)
 Artan Bano (22 Jan 2011 – May 2011)
 Përparim Daiu (Aug 2011 – 2 Oct 2011)
 Eqerem Memushi (2 Oct 2011 – 15 Mar 2012)
 Madrit Muzhaj (interim)'' (Mar 2012)
 Ernest Gjoka (15 Mar 2012 – Jun 2012)
 Kristaq Mile (Jul 2012 – 8 Nov 2012)
 Madrit Muxhaj (Nov 2012 – Jun 2014)
 Eqerem Memushi (Jul 2014 - Dec 2014)
 Madrit Muxhaj (Dec 2014 – Apr 2015)
 Kristaq Mile (Apr 2015 - May 2015)
 Bledar Sinella (Aug 2015 – Nov 2016)
 Gentian Stojku (Nov 2016 - Apr 2017)
 Santiljano Dule (Jul 2017 - Nov 2017)
 Gersi Arbëri (Nov 2017 - Sep 2018)
 Bledar Devolli (Sep 2018 - Dec 2018)
 Santiljano Dule (Jan 2019  August 2019 )
 Kristaq Mile (August 2019; - June 2020 )
 Bledar Sinella (June 2020; - July 2021)
 Klevis Dalipi (July 2021- Dec 2021)
 Klodian Arbëri (Jan 2022- )

Sponsor

Kit providers and sponsors
(2012– ) Ola1

References

Football clubs in Albania
Association football clubs established in 1923
1923 establishments in Albania
Football clubs in Berat
 
Kategoria e Dytë clubs